Chaos is a 2005 action thriller film starring Jason Statham, Ryan Phillippe and Wesley Snipes, and written and directed by Tony Giglio. The film premiered in the United Arab Emirates on December 15, 2005, but did not receive a North American release until over two years later, where it was distributed direct-to-DVD on February 19, 2008.

Plot

Seattle PD Detective Quentin Conners and his partner Jason York are implicated in the death of a hostage taken by a carjacker named John Curtis. After a fellow police officer, Callo, testifies against them, Conners is suspended, and York is fired. In reality, York tried to shoot Curtis, but accidentally killed the hostage. Curtis in turn fired back, and Conners killed him in self-defense.

Some time later, Lorenz and four other criminals take hostages in a bank. Lorenz has only one demand, to negotiate with Conners. Conners is reinstated but put under the surveillance of a new partner, the recently-graduated Shane Dekker. Conners is given control of the negotiations, and after a bank teller is shot, he orders a SWAT unit to cut the building's power and go in. During an explosion, the criminals flee during the ensuing panic and chaos.

Dekker and Conners learn more about each other at a local diner, slowly building a friendship, but Dekker disapproves of Conners' "cowboy cop" methods. Dekker explains that during negotiations, Lorenz was making many cryptic references to chaos theory. As they leave to examine new evidence, Conners puts a ten dollar bill on the table for his share of the bill. Dekker swaps the ten for a twenty of his own. A TV camera caught a shot of one of the criminals, who is arrested together with his girlfriend at her home, where banknotes are found with a scent used to mark evidence collected by the police. The banknote serial numbers did not come from that day's robbery, but had been placed in police storage and signed out two weeks earlier by Callo. He is found shot dead in his home, together with incriminating evidence linking him to the heist.

When reviewing video footage from the bank, Dekker notices one corner of the bank is deliberately shielded from view. In that corner, they find the bank regional manager's computer. Fingerprints on the keyboard reveal the identity of a hacker that Conners himself had arrested, but whose conviction was overturned after the shooting on the bridge. Conners and Dekker want to question the hacker, but he is shot dead by Lorenz, and a gunfight ensues, during which Lorenz manages to escape. Dekker questions the hospitalized bank robber identified in the news footage and finally breaks him when he casually explains the impact of a massive overdose of morphine while slowly injecting something into the suspect's drip. An amazed Conners watches and later calls him a hypocrite. Dekker responds by explaining he only injected more saline solution.

The suspect reveals Lorenz is Scott Curtis, the brother of John shot earlier, and Conners leads a stakeout at an address where all the gang are to meet that night; Scott's house. Forced to go before Scott arrives, a shootout results in both suspects' deaths, and a bomb blows up the building while Conners is inside. Dekker is devastated but realizes that Callo's signature requesting material from the evidence storage was forged by the evidence custody officer, who reveals that Scott is actually York. In a flashback, York stands on the bridge and fires the first shot, killing the hostage in the opening sequence. Tracking Lorenz/York's mobile phone, Dekker surprises York at a diner, and York takes a woman hostage in a reversal of the standoff on the bridge. Dekker chases and eventually kills York.

When Dekker pays for his coffee at the diner, he discovers the banknote Conners used to pay for lunch with is also scented, which means Conners was also involved in taking the money from police evidence. Dekker finds a copy of James Gleick's Chaos: Making a New Science in Conners' house, showing he had faked an earlier ignorance of the mathematics. On a hunch, Dekker looks for airline tickets booked in Gleick's name and runs to the airport.

During a mobile call between the now disguised Conners and the searching Dekker at the busy airport, flashbacks reveal how the seemingly unconnected events in the film form a pattern, just as predicted in chaos theory. Conners reveals that he placed his badge on the corpse of one of York's henchmen before the explosion. Conners and York recruited a group of ex-convicts from their past. Callo was framed for being a dirty cop. Conners ends the call, walks casually to a private jet, and takes off while sipping champagne.

Cast

Production
The film was a co-production between the United Kingdom, Canada, and the United States. Principal photography took place in Seattle, Washington and Vancouver, British Columbia, in locations including Simon Fraser University and the Burrard Street Bridge.

The film was originally set to be produced by Franchise Pictures with distribution by Warner Bros., which began to suffer serious financial problems early into production due to the failures of its previous film Battlefield Earth, and allegations of fraud concerning artificial inflation of the film's budget to increase investment from German production company Intertainment AG. This led to Franchise's then-parent company Mobius International to take over production. Due to last-minute budgetary constraints imposed by the new producers, the film's script was heavily rewritten to accommodate a reduced shooting schedule (40 days to 22 days). Lead actor Jason Statham had signed a two-picture deal with Franchise, a deal which included both Chaos and a heist film titled Baker Street. The latter was placed on hold after Franchise filed for Chapter 11 Bankruptcy, where it was eventually produced by Relativity Media and released in 2008 under the title The Bank Job.

Release
Screen Gems at one point was attached as the film's theatrical distributor, but a financial deal couldn't be made regarding release prints and advertising between the studio and producers. Eventually Lionsgate picked up the film and went through the same drama with producers, leading to a three-year delay in the film's North American release.

Reception 
Michael S. Gant of Metro Silicon Valley wrote, "The plot depends on an impossible chain of coincidences, but there are some decent car chases." Ian Jane of DVD Talk rated it 2.5/5 stars and wrote, "Chaos has a nice twist towards the end but is otherwise riddled with bad action movie clichés and poorly written dialogue."  Jeffrey Kauffman, also of DVD Talk, rated it 3/5 stars and wrote, "Chaos isn't a bad film; it just isn't a very good one either."  Tom Becker DVD Verdict wrote, "Chaos isn't a great movie, but it's entertaining and manages to keep you off-kilter for much of its running time. While the film is ultimately too clever for its own good, Giglio gets points for trying to smart-up the genre." Also writing for DVD Verdict, David Johnson said, "Chaos may not redefine what's possible in the police suspense thriller, but it's satisfying and entertaining enough to earn a look-see by fans of the genre or anyone hankering for a decent, plot-twist-heavy actioner."

References

External links
 

2005 films
2005 direct-to-video films
2005 crime thriller films
2005 action thriller films
British crime thriller films
British action thriller films
English-language Canadian films
Canadian crime thriller films
Canadian action thriller films
American crime thriller films
American action thriller films
Police detective films
Films shot in Vancouver
Films shot in Seattle
Films set in Seattle
Films directed by Tony Giglio
Films about bank robbery
Films scored by Trevor Jones
2000s chase films
Buddy drama films
2000s buddy cop films
2000s English-language films
2000s American films
2000s Canadian films
2000s British films